List of works by or about Irwin Shaw, American author.

Novels

 The young lions (1948)
 The Troubled Air (1951)
 Lucy Crown (1956)
 Two Weeks in Another Town (1960)
 Voices of a Summer Day (1965)
 Rich Man, Poor Man (1969/1970)
 Evening in Byzantium (1973)
 Night Work (1975)
 Beggarman, Thief (1977)
 The Top of the Hill (1979)
 Bread Upon the Waters (1981)
 Acceptable Losses (1982)

Short fiction 
Collections
 Sailor off the Bremen and other Stories (1939)
 Welcome to the City, and other Stories (1942)
 Act of Faith, and other stories (1946)
 The Girls in Their Summer Dresses
 Mixed Company. Collected Short Stories (1950)
 Tip on a Dead Jockey, and other stories (1957)
 Selected Short Stories (1961)
 Love on a Dark Street, and other stories (1965)
 Retreat and other stories (1970)
 Whispers in Bedlam (1972)
 God Was Here, But He Left Early (1973)
 Short Stories: Five Decades (1978)
Stories

Non-fiction
 Report on Israel (1950, with Robert Capa)
 In the Company of Dolphins (1964)
 Paris! Paris! (1976)

Plays
 Bury the Dead, New York, Ethel Barrymore Theatre, April 1936.
 Siege, New York, Longacre Theatre, December 1937.
 The Gentle People, New York, Belasco Theatre, January 1939.
 Quiet City New York, Belasco Theatre, March 1939.
 Retreat to Pleasure, New York, Belasco Theatre, 1940.
 Sons and Soldiers, New York, Morosco Theatre, May 1943.
 The Assassin, New York, National Theatre, October 1945.
 The Survivors, (with Peter Viertel) New York, Playhouse Theatre, January 1948.
 Children From Their Games, New York, Morosco Theatre, April 1963.
 A Choice of Wars, Glasgow, Scotland, Glasgow Citizens Theatre, 1967.

Screenplays
 The Big Game, RKO, 1936.
 Commandos Strike at Dawn, Columbia, 1942.
 The Hard Way, Warner Bros., 1942.
 The Talk of the Town, RKO, 1942.
 Take One False Step, Universal, 1949.
 Easy Living, RKO, 1949.
 I Want You, RKO, 1951.
 Act of Love, United Artists, 1953.
 Ulysses, Paramount, 1954.
 Fire Down Below, Columbia, 1957.
 Desire Under the Elms, Paramount, 1958.
 This Angry Age, Columbia, 1958.
 The Big Gamble, Fox, 1961.
 In the French Style, Columbia, 1963.
 Survival, United Film, 1968.

Notes and full bibliographic citations 

Bibliographies by writer
Bibliographies of American writers